Enrico Alfonso (born 4 May 1988) is an Italian professional footballer who plays as a goalkeeper for SPAL.

Club career

Early career
Aged only 6 years old, Alfonso began his playing career with Alte di Montecchio. He spent 4 years with the club, before moving for one season at Montecchio Maggiore at the age of 10.

After that season, Alfonso joined Chievo's Giovanissimi. He was sent on loan to Pizzighettone of Serie C1 in summer 2006. He was competing with Alex Cordaz for first choice until Cordaz ended his loan.

Internazionale
On 27 August 2007, he joined Internazionale on co-ownership deal, for €1.9 million, signing a five-year deal with the club. He replaced Fabián Carini, who left for Real Murcia, as fourth goalkeeper (but in UEFA Champions League the 4th keeper was Paolo Tornaghi). He took the 71 shirt, which was previously owned by Cordaz.

On 17 January 2008 Alfonso made his debut against Reggina in the Coppa Italia, in the match he was forced to make two good saves in the end Inter won 3–0, and 7–1 on aggregate.

In January 2008 Alfonso was loaned out to Venezia until the end of the 2007–08 season.

Alfonso spent the 2008–09 season on loan to Serie B side Pisa. After Pisa's relegation to Lega Pro Prima Divisione, and ultimately its financial collapse, Internazionale secured a loan move to Modena for Alfonso for the 2009-10 Serie B season. In the next season he became the starting goalkeeper of Modena, played 31 times.

In July 2011 he was transferred to Cremonese along with Michele Rigione and Riccardo Bocalon. He finished as the losing semi-finalists in the promotion playoffs.

On 21 June 2012, Inter bought Alfonso outright for €1.1 million, with Matteo Solini returned to Chievo also for €1.1 million. In July 2012, he returned to Cremonese.

Lega Pro clubs
In late July 2013 Alfonso joined Vicenza as a trialist, which he played as one of the starting keeper in the pre-season game. On 10 August 2013 Alfonso signed a 1-year contract with Vicenza and immediately submitted to the office of Lega Pro . Alfonso immediately replaced Angelo Di Stasio as the starting keeper of Vicenza in competitive game, the second round of 2013–14 Coppa Italia. He was the first choice in the match after, against Del Piero's Sydney FC. Vicenza promoted back to Serie B in 2014 as a replacement of Siena, despite finished a losing quarter-finalist in 2014 promotion playoffs.

On 26 September 2014, Alfonso went to Pro Piacenza as a free agent.

On 16 July 2015, Alfonso was signed by A.S. Cittadella.

Return to Cremonese
On 26 August 2020 he returned to Cremonese.

SPAL
On 29 January 2022, he signed with SPAL until 30 June 2023.

International career
Alfonso had been part of every minor Italy national football teams, from the under-15 till the under-21. He took part in 2005 UEFA European Under-17 Football Championship (which he was sent off in the third match) and 2005 FIFA U-17 World Championship. He was not played in any match of 2007 UEFA European Under-19 Football Championship elite qualification and rarely selected to U-19 team.

On 5 September 2007, the round 1 of 2007–08 Four Nations Tournament, Alfonso played the whole match of Italy under-20 national team against Switzerland. Alfonso managed to hold a clean sheet, as the match ended in a goalless draw.

On 5 October 2007, Pierluigi Casiraghi called up Alfonso, along with teammate Francesco Bolzoni, to form part of the Italy national under-21 football team. The national side would be involved in the 2009 UEFA European Under-21 Football Championship qualification matches against Croatia and Greece. However, he did not play nor on the bench. That season he only managed to play the third and sixth round of the Four Nations Tournament.

He was called up to the 2008 Toulon Tournament from Italy Olympic where he played two matches keeping one clean sheet, during the group stages, after Italy already qualified for the next round with a win. He was not selected to 2008 Olympics in August. Despite still being eligible for the 2009–11 season, he did not receive any call-up since May 2008.

References

External links
 
 FIGC  
 

Living people
1988 births
Sportspeople from Padua
Association football goalkeepers
Italian footballers
Italy youth international footballers
Italy under-21 international footballers
A.C. ChievoVerona players
A.S. Pizzighettone players
Inter Milan players
Pisa S.C. players
Venezia F.C. players
Modena F.C. players
U.S. Cremonese players
L.R. Vicenza players
A.S. Cittadella players
Brescia Calcio players
S.P.A.L. players
Serie A players
Serie B players
Serie C players
Footballers from Veneto